Gančani is a village in the Municipality of Beltinci in the Prekmurje region of northeastern Slovenia.

There is a chapel with a two-storey belfry in the centre of the village. It is dedicated to the Sacred Heart of Jesus and belongs to the Parish of Beltinci.

References

External links
Gančani on Geopedia

Populated places in the Municipality of Beltinci